Don Francisco te invita is an American television talk show that premiered on Telemundo on 9 October 2016. It is a Spanish version of the American programs in English Late Show. The program is presented by Don Francisco, who previously worked at Don Francisco Presenta. On 26 July 2018, Telemundo announced that the show was canceled. The final episode aired on 9 December 2018.

Ratings

References

External links 
 

2010s American late-night television series
2016 American television series debuts
2018 American television series endings
Spanish-language television shows
Telemundo original programming